French ship Ulm may refer to:

French ship Ulm (1809), a Téméraire-class 74-gun ship of the line of the French Navy
French ship Ulm (1854), a 100-gun Hercule-class ship of the line of the French Navy

Ship names